Plawecki is a surname. Notable people with the surname include:

David Plawecki (1947–2013), American politician
Julie Plawecki (1961–2016), American politician, wife of Mark
Kevin Plawecki (born 1991), American baseball player
Lauren Plawecki (born 1994), American politician, daughter of Julie and Mark
Lukasz Plawecki (born 1987), Polish kickboxer
Mark Plawecki (born 1961), American judge, husband of Julie